Kedleston Hall is a neo-classical manor house, and seat of the Curzon family, located in Kedleston, Derbyshire, approximately 4 miles (6 km) north-west of Derby. The medieval village of Kedleston was moved in 1759 by Nathaniel Curzon to make way for the manor. All that remains of the original village is the 12th century All Saints Church, Kedleston. 
Members of the family have held 14 hereditary titles such as: Marquess Curzon of Kedleston, Earl Howe, Earl Curzon of Kedleston, Viscount Curzon, Viscount Scarsdale, Viscounts Howe, Curzon of Kedleston, Baron Scarsdale, Baron Ravensdale, Lord of the Manor of Curzon, Baron Howe, Baron Curzon, Baronet Mosley, and Baronet of Kedleston Hall.

House of Curzon
The current house was commissioned in 1759 by Nathaniel Curzon and designed by Robert Adam. George Nathaniel Curzon is Kedleston's first Marquess Curzon, the first son of the fourth Baron Scarsdale. The second Baroness Ravensdale was Irene Mary Curzon (1896–1966). The third Baron Ravensdale (b. 1923), was Sir Nicholas Mosley, born to George Curzon's daughter, Cynthia Blanche Mosley (1898–1933). The first Earl Howe included Curzon-Howe Richard William (1796–1870); Curzon-Howe George Frederick (1821–1876). The third Earl Howe going forward included the third, fourth, fifth, sixth and seventh Earl Howe as Curzon-Howe Richard William (1822–1900), Curzon Richard George (1861–1929), Curzon Francis Penn (1884–1964), Curzon Richard Assheton (1908–1984), and Curzon Frederick Richard (b. 1951), in that order.

On the death of the second Viscount Scarsdale, Richard Curzon in 1977, expenses compelled the heir, his cousin (Francis Curzon), to transfer the property to the care of the National Trust.

Places and facilities named after the Curzon family name include Curzon Street believed to have been named after the third Viscount Howe, Mr. George Howe, and later transferred to another member of the family whose last name was Curzon. Curzon Avenue is a street in England's North West expanse, specifically Northwich, in the Weaver Vale constituency. In the world of athletics, Curzon Ashton F.C. is a soccer club situated in Ashton-Under-Lyne, which traces its history to the family's name owing to a few members of the family who participated in football. The key parks bearing the Curzon family name include Roker Curzon Park (Sunderland), Curzon Park (in Chester), and Curzon Park Abbey (a monastery of nuns).

Exterior 

The design of the three-floored house is of three blocks linked by two segmentally curved corridors. The ground floor is rusticated, while the upper floors are of smooth-dressed stone. The central, corps de logis, the largest block, contains the state rooms and was intended only for formal entertaining. The East block was a self-contained country house in its own right, containing all the rooms for the family's private use, and the identical West block contained the kitchens and all other domestic rooms and staff accommodation.

Plans for two more pavilions (as the two smaller blocks are known), of identical size and similar appearance, were never executed. These further wings were intended to contain, in the south-east a music room, and in the southwest a conservatory and chapel. Externally these latter pavilions would have differed from their northern counterparts by large glazed Serlian windows on the piano nobile of their southern facades. Here the blocks were to appear as of two floors only; a mezzanine was to have been disguised in the north of the music room block. The linking galleries here were also to contain larger windows, than on the north, and niches containing classical statuary.

This garden facade is divided into three distinct sets of bays; the central section is a four-columned, blind triumphal arch (based on the Arch of Constantine in Rome) containing one large, pedimented glass door reached from the rusticated ground floor by an external, curved double staircase. Above the door, at second-floor height, are stone garlands and medallions in relief.

The four Corinthian columns are topped by classical statues. This whole centre section of the facade is crowned by a low dome visible only from a distance. Flanking the central section are two identical wings on three floors, each three windows wide, the windows of the first-floor piano nobile being the tallest. Adam's design for this facade contains huge "movement" and has a delicate almost fragile quality.

Interior 

The neoclassical interior of the house was designed by Adam to be no less impressive than the exterior. Entering the house through the great north portico on the piano nobile, one is confronted by the marble hall designed to suggest the open courtyard or atrium of a Roman villa.

Twenty fluted alabaster columns with Corinthian capitals support the heavily decorated, high-coved cornice. Niches in the walls contain classical statuary; above the niches are grisaille panels. The floor is of inlaid Italian marble. Matthew Paine's original designs for this room intended for it to be lit by conventional windows at the northern end, but Adam, warming to the Roman theme, did away with the distracting windows and lit the whole from the roof through innovative glass skylight.

At Kedleston, the hall symbolises the atrium of the Roman villa and the adjoining saloon the vestibulum. The saloon, contained behind the triumphal arch of the south front, like the marble hall rises the full height of the house, 62 feet to the top of the dome, where it too is sky-lit through a glass oculus. Designed as a sculpture gallery, this circular room was completed in 1763. The decorative theme is based on the temples of the Roman Forum with more modern inventions: in the four massive, apse-like recesses are stoves disguised as pedestals for classical urns. The four sets of double doors giving entry to the room have heavy pediments supported by scagliola columns, and at second-floor height, grisaille panels depict classical themes.

From the saloon, the atmosphere of the 18th-century Grand Tour is continued throughout the remainder of the principal reception rooms of the piano nobile, though on a slightly more modest scale. The "principal apartment", or State bedroom suite, contains fine furniture and paintings as does the drawing room with its huge Venetian window; the dining room, with its gigantic apse, has a ceiling that Adam based on the Palace of Augustus in the Farnese Gardens.

The theme carries on through the library, music room, down the grand staircase (not completed until 1922) onto the ground floor and into the so-called "Caesar's hall". On the departure of guests, it must sometimes have been a relief to vacate this temple of culture and retreat to the relatively simple comforts of the family pavilion.

Below the Rotunda is the Tetrastyle Hall, which was converted into a museum in 1927. The kitchen is an oblong shape with a balustraded gallery at one end. This links the room to other household offices on each side.

Also displayed in the house are many curiosities pertaining to George, Lord Curzon of Kedleston, who succeeded to the house in 1916 and who had earlier served as Viceroy of India from 1899 to 1905. Lord Curzon had amassed a large collection of subcontinental and Far Eastern artefacts. Also shown is Lady Curzon's Delhi Durbar Coronation dress of 1903. Designed by Worth of Paris, it was known as the peacock dress for the many precious and semi-precious stones sewn into its fabric. These have now been replaced by imitation stones; however, the effect is no less dazzling.

In addition to that described above, this great country house contains collections of art, furniture and statuary. Kedleston Hall's alternative name, The Temple of the Arts, is truly justified.

Gardens and grounds 
 

The gardens and grounds, as they appear today, are largely the concept of Robert Adam. Adam was asked by Nathaniel Curzon in 1758 to "take in hand the deer park and pleasure grounds". The landscape gardener William Emes had begun work at Kedleston in 1756, and he continued in Curzon's employ until 1760; however, it was Adam who was the guiding influence. It was during this period that the former gardens designed by Charles Bridgeman were swept away in favour of a more natural-looking landscape. Bridgeman's canals and geometric ponds were metamorphosed into serpentine lakes.

Adam designed numerous temples and follies, many of which were never built. Those that were include the North lodge (which takes the form of a triumphal arch), the entrance lodges in the village, a bridge, cascade and the Fishing Room. The Fishing Room is one of the most noticeable of the park's buildings. In the neoclassical style it is sited on the edge of the upper lake and contains a plunge pool and boat house below. Some of Adam's unexecuted design for follies in the park rivalled in grandeur the house itself.

A "View Tower" designed in 1760 – 84 feet high and 50 feet wide on five floors, surmounted by a saucer dome flanked by the smaller domes of flanking towers — would have been a small neoclassical palace itself. Adam planned to transform even mundane utilitarian buildings into architectural wonders. A design for a pheasant house (a platform to provide a vantage point for the game shooting) became a domed temple, the roofs of its classical porticos providing the necessary platforms; this plan too was never completed. Among the statuary in the grounds is a Medici lion sculpture carved by Joseph Wilton on a pedestal designed by Samuel Wyatt, from around 1760–1770.

In the 1770s, George Richardson designed the hexagonal summerhouse, and in 1800 the orangery. The Long Walk was laid out in 1760 and planted with flowering shrubs and ornamental trees. In 1763, it was reported that Lord Scarsdale had given his gardener a seed from rare and scarce Italian shrub, the "Rodo Dendrone" (sic).

The gardens and grounds today, over two hundred years later, remain mostly unaltered. Parts of the park are designated as a Site of Special Scientific Interest, primarily because of the "rich and diverse deadwood invertebrate fauna" inhabiting its ancient trees.

Later history

The Curzon family, whose name originates in Notre-Dame-de-Courson in Normandy, have been in Kedleston since at least 1297,  and have lived in a succession of manor houses near to or on the site of the present Kedleston Hall. The present house was commissioned by Sir Nathaniel Curzon (later 1st Baron Scarsdale) in 1759. The house was designed by the Palladian architects James Paine and Matthew Brettingham and was loosely based on an original plan by Andrea Palladio for the never-built Villa Mocenigo.

At the time a relatively unknown architect, Robert Adam, was designing some garden temples to enhance the landscape of the park; Curzon was so impressed with his designs that Adam was quickly put in charge of the construction of the new mansion.

Second World War 
In 1939, Kedleston Hall was offered by Richard Curzon, 2nd Viscount Scarsdale, for use by the War Office. The Hall was used in various ways during the War, including as a mustering point and army training camp.

It also formed one of the Y-stations used to gather signals intelligence by collecting radio transmissions which, if encrypted, were subsequently passed to Bletchley Park for decryption.

National Trust
By the 1970s Kedleston Hall had become too expensive for the Curzon family to maintain. When Richard Curzon, 2nd Viscount Scarsdale, died, his cousin Francis Curzon, 3rd Viscount Scarsdale, offered the house, park and gardens to the nation in lieu of death duties. A deal was agreed with the National Trust that it should take over Kedleston, along with an endowment, while still allowing the family to live rent-free in the 23-room Family Wing, which contained an adjoining garden and two rent-free flats for servants or other family members. Richard Curzon and his family currently reside there.

See also 
Grade I listed buildings in Derbyshire
Listed buildings in Kedleston
All Saints Church, Kedleston, traditional burial place of the Curzon family of Kedleston Hall
Raj Bhavan in Calcutta, which as 'Government House' served as the official residence of the Governor-General of India from its completion in 1803 until the capital of British India was shifted to New Delhi in the early 20th century. Government House was built on the lines of Kedleston Hall. By coincidence a prominent member of the House of Curzon, George, Lord Curzon of Kedleston, became Viceroy of India in 1899 and was consequently resident of both houses.

The travel writer E. V. Lucas later commented that "It is easier in Calcutta to be suddenly transported to England than in any other Indian city that I visited. There are, it is true, more statues of Lord Curzon than we are accustomed to [in England]; but many of the homes are quite English, save for the multitude of servants; Government House, serene and spacious and patrician, is a replica of Kedlestone Hall in Derbyshire."

References

External links

Kedleston Hall information at the National Trust
Kedleston Hall Garden — information on garden history
Kedleston Hall entry from The DiCamillo Companion to British & Irish Country Houses
List of paintings on view in Kedleston Hall

Art museums and galleries in Derbyshire
Country houses in Derbyshire
!
Gardens in Derbyshire
Grade I listed buildings in Derbyshire
Grade I listed houses
Historic house museums in Derbyshire
Military history of Derbyshire
National Trust properties in Derbyshire
Robert Adam buildings
Tourist attractions of the Peak District
Y service